Thalattu Padava is a 1990 Tamil language drama film directed by R. Sundarrajan. It stars Parthiban, Rupini and Kushboo. The film, produced by A. S. Ibrahim Rowther, was released on 5 September 1990.

Plot

Raja lives with his mother Thayamma and he is a graduate who works as a mechanic until he finds an appropriate job. He finally gets a job in Delhi. Unfortunately, Raja misses the train in a station and his certificates, because of Narmadha, a poor idli seller. Raja must wait 4 days for the next train. Slowly, Raja and Narmadha fall in love with each other. When he returns home, his mother Thayamma becomes mute. Raja works as the car driver of a rich man Kandhasamy and his granddaughter Narmadha teases him a lot. Until she knows that he is well educated and she falls in love with him. What transpires later forms the crux of the story.

Cast

Parthiban as Raja
Rupini as Narmadha
Kushboo as Narmadha
Sujatha as Thayamma, Raja's mother
S. S. Chandran as Kandhasamy
Senthil
Jai Ganesh
Rajyalakshmi
Sudha
K. R. Savithri
MLA Thangaraj
Balu Anand 
Super Subbarayan

Soundtrack

The film score and the soundtrack were composed by Ilaiyaraaja. The soundtrack, released in 1990, features 6 tracks with lyrics written by Vaali and Gangai Amaran.

References

1990 films
Films scored by Ilaiyaraaja
1990s Tamil-language films
Films directed by R. Sundarrajan